Keith Neal FFPHM FRCP DM is emeritus professor in the epidemiology of infectious diseases at the University of Nottingham. He previously worked as a consultant epidemiologist for the Field Epidemiology Service of Public Health England.

Career
Neal trained in infectious diseases and public health. He afterwards worked as a senior lecturer, then professor, in the epidemiology of infectious diseases and as a consultant for the UK public health services (Health authorities, Health Protection Agency and Public Health England) as a consultant epidemiologist for over 30 years. His research interests included hepatitis C, meningococcal disease, food poisoning risks and sequelae, particularly campylobacter, and making surgery safer. He was involved in vaccine trials for HPV and meningitis. His public health work included outbreak investigation and management, vaccine and travel advice, assessing clinical services and delivering epidemiological services to a region (5-8 million people). He represented his colleagues on the national infected health care workers advisory panel, hepatitis, meningitis and food poisoning national groups. He has also worked on the public health response to Ebola outbreaks including 3 visits to Sierra Leonne.

References

External links 
https://www.researchgate.net/profile/Keith_Neal

Living people
Academics of the University of Nottingham
Year of birth missing (living people)
British public health doctors
Alumni of the University of Southampton
Fellows of the Royal College of Physicians